Georgina "Georgie" Kimberley Hagen (born 21 June 1991) is an English actress and singer. She is most known for her appearance as Lauren Waters, from ITV's Britannia High. She also featured in The Story of Tracy Beaker as Rebecca Chalmers in 2005.

Early life
As a child, Hagen starred in a number of West end musicals, including Chitty Chitty Bang Bang at the London Palladium and as the voice of Control in the 2004–2013 UK tour of Starlight Express - The 3rd Dimension, on which her father, Peter Hagen, was musical director. Her mother is actress Susie Fenwick who has appeared in many West End productions. She was heard alongside actors such as Oliver Thornton and Tim Driesen. She studied at the Sylvia Young Theatre School in London.

Career
Hagen starred in Britannia High as Lauren Waters alongside Mitch Hewer, Sapphire Elia, Matthew James Thomas, Rana Roy, Marcquelle Ward, Sophie Powles and Adam Garcia. She went through a year-long audition process which involved dance, drama and singing workshops.

Hagen has starred as Meat in the 2009/2010 UK tour of Queen musical We Will Rock You'''', and played the lead role of Pearl in Starlight Express in Bochum, Germany until May 25, 2014. She recently featured in Tim Minchin's new Musical 'Groundhog Day', in which she played the role of Nancy Taylor.

Personal life
Hagen is the second cousin of Perry Fenwick, who plays Billy Mitchell in EastEnders''.

Filmography

Television

Theatre

References

External links 

 Georgina Hagen Official personal Twitter account
 Georgina Hagen fans Fan update account

English television actresses
English musical theatre actresses
Alumni of the Sylvia Young Theatre School
1991 births
Living people
Actresses from London